Roucourt is the name of a number of places :
Roucourt, Nord, a place in the Nord-Pas de Calais Region of France
Roucourt, Hainaut, a place in the Hainaut Province of Belgium